The 2022 San Miguel Corporation (SMC) - Philippine Sportswriters Association (PSA) Annual Awards is an annual awarding ceremony honoring the individuals (athletes, coaches and officials) and organizations that made a significant impact to Philippine sports in 2021.

The awarding ceremony is set to be held at the March 14, 2022, at the Diamond Hotel in Manila. This would be the first time that the PSA will hold its physical awards night, with a limited capacity (in accordance with the IATF and the government's health and safety protocols) during the COVID-19 pandemic, after staging the 2021 edition virtually. All guests must required to bring vaccination cards or certificates to enter the venue.

The PSA, currently headed by its president, Rey Lachica, sports editor of Tempo, is the oldest Philippine-based media group manned by sportswriters, sports reporters, sports editors, columnists from broadsheets, tabloids, online sports websites, and radio stations.

Honor roll

Main awards
The following are the list of main awards of the event.

Athlete of the Year

The PSA awards is set to be led by weightlifter Hidilyn Diaz who will be named as the PSA Athlete of the Year for the third time (Diaz bagged the same award in 2016 and 2018); for her feat of clinching the Philippines first ever Olympic gold medal at the 2020 Summer Olympics in Tokyo.

Other major awardees
Here are the other major awards to be conferred in the Awards Night.

Major awardees
Sorted in alphabetical order (based on their surnames).

Citations
Sorted in alphabetical order (based on their surnames).

See also
2021 in Philippine sports

References

PSA
PSA